General elections were held in British Guiana on 3 September 1935.

Electoral system
The elections were held in accordance with the 1928 constitution, which established the Legislative Council, reducing the proportion of elected members and increasing the number of members appointed by the government. The 30-member Legislative Council consisted of the Governor, two ex-officio members, eight official members, five unofficial members and 14 members elected in single-member constituencies.

Results

Aftermath
The first meeting of the newly elected Council was held on 15 October. As there were no elections until 1947, the elected Legislative Council became known as the "Long Parliament".

References

Elections in Guyana
1935 in British Guiana
British Guiana
Election and referendum articles with incomplete results
British Guiana